A list of commercial phonics programs designed for teaching reading in English (arranged by country of origin to acknowledge regional language variations).

United States
 Open Court Reading; name changed to "Imagine It!" in 2008 
 Orton-Gillingham
 Phono-graphix (1993) – developed by Carmen and Geoffrey McGuinness
 Preventing Academic Failure (PAF) program (1978)
 Reading Mastery by SRA/McGraw-Hill, previously known as DISTAR
 Smart Way Reading and Spelling (2001) 
 Spalding Method

Online and software programs
 JumpStart Phonics
 Starfall (website)

See also

 Phonics
 Reading
 Synthetic phonics

References

Phonics curricula
Phonics